Alzada Peckham Comstock (November 23, 1888 – January 15, 1960) was an economist who taught at Mount Holyoke College.  She became a Guggenheim Fellow in 1926.

Early life and education
Comstock was born in Waterford, Connecticut. She earned a B.A. from Mount Holyoke College in 1910, followed by a master's degree from Columbia University in 1913.  In 1921, she completed a Ph.D. at Columbia University.

Career 
In 1913, Comstock began teaching as an instructor in economics and sociology at Mount Holyoke College. During the summers of 1914 and 1915, she was a statistical expert for the Massachusetts Minimum Wage Commission. She was promoted to the rank of Associate Professor at Mount Holyoke in 1917.

In 1926, Comstock was awarded a Guggenheim Fellowship, with the stated purpose "to make a study of the League of Nations’ financial reconstruction work in Hungary, with especial reference to taxation and the use of the international loan." By 1927, she had become a full professor at Mount Holyoke teaching economics.  She chaired the American Association of University Women (AAUW) for five years.

In 1930, Comstock published a book, Taxation in the Modern State, which was reviewed by the Journal of Political Economy, the Journal of the Royal Statistical Society, and The Economic Journal. The book analyzes the changes in taxation in the United States, Great Britain, Germany, France, and Italy after World War I. The reviews were lukewarm, generally observing that it had identified an important subject but not developed it in sufficient depth: in the words of one reviewer, "The accounts of these tax methods, in a part only of a small book, are necessarily very brief... and one does not find very much light on the question of how they are really made to work." However, the overall information was considered correct and useful, and it was recommended for use as a textbook "written in an unusually lucid and interesting style." One reviewer mistook Comstock for a man, mistakenly referring to "the author" as "he."

In 1954, some of Comstock's former students from Mount Holyoke published a collection of essays as a festschrift for her, titled "Those Having Torches..." Economic Essays in Honor of Alzada Comstock. A reviewer praised the volume for being unusually cohesive and readable for a festschrift volume, "Perhaps because of the influence of the personality and teaching of Alzada Comstock." The economics research presented in the volume was on timely subjects, with historical rather than theoretical or deeply mathematical methodology, "presented with clarity and in language devoid of technical jargon," also reflecting Comstock's influence. The reviewer also reflected on the gender of the authors, concluding the review with the observation: "For those interested in women's education, the notes on the contributors and their experience are striking evidence of the opportunities open to women today, and are a record of which, as well as of their tribute to her, Miss Comstock may well be proud."

Personal life 
Comstock died in 1960, at age 72. The archive of her papers held at Mount Holyoke contain letters written between 1915 and 1922, including those reflecting her "intense and affectionate relationship with a Mount Holyoke student, Helen Graves Fisk, class of 1917."

Publications
 "Financing a New Republic," The North American Review, Vol. 217, No. 807 (Feb., 1923), pp. 187–196.
 Taxation in the Modern State. 1930.
 "Excises in Modern Times," The Annals of the American Academy of Political and Social Science, January 1, 1936.
 "India Rejects British Self-Rule Plan", Current History, Vol.2, No.9, May 1942, pp.175-186

References

1888 births
1960 deaths
20th-century American economists
American women economists
People from Waterford, Connecticut
Mount Holyoke College alumni
Columbia University alumni
Mount Holyoke College faculty
American Association of University Women
Economists from Connecticut
Place of death missing
20th-century American women